Michèle San Vicente-Baudrin (born 19 May 1955) is a member of the Senate of France, representing the Pas-de-Calais department.  She is a member of the Socialist Party.

References
Page on the Senate website

1955 births
Living people
French Senators of the Fifth Republic
Socialist Party (France) politicians
Women members of the Senate (France)
Senators of Pas-de-Calais